The following elections occurred in the year 1815:

 1815 French legislative election (disambiguation)
 May 1815 French legislative election
 August 1815 French legislative election
 United States Senate election in New York, 1815

See also
 :Category:1815 elections

1815
Elections